Jules-Théodore-Joseph Cazot (11 February 1821 – 27 November 1912) was a French politician of the French Third Republic. He was a member of the National Assembly of 1871. He was a senator for life from 1875 until his death. He was minister of justice in 1880 and 1881, under the governments of Jules Ferry and Léon Gambetta.

Sources
 

1821 births
1912 deaths
People from Alès
Politicians from Occitania (administrative region)
Republican Union (France) politicians
French Ministers of Justice
Members of the National Assembly (1871)
French life senators